Charles Stuart (7 November 167712 December 1677) was the first of two sons and third of seven children born from the marriage between James, Duke of York (later James II of England & VII of Scotland) and Mary of Modena. He was styled Duke of Cambridge, but never formally created so, because he died so young.

Life
At the time of his birth at St James's Palace, Charles was the second surviving child of James and Mary, a sister, Catherine Laura, having died the previous year. Another sister, Isabella, one year older than Charles, died at the age of four in 1681. At the time of Charles' birth, his uncle, Charles II of England, had no legitimate children and his queen consort, Catherine of Braganza, was reaching the age of 40 and it was clear enough that she would have no children and that the Duke of York would succeed as King.

Because all of James' sons with his first wife, Anne Hyde, were dead, the newborn Charles would then succeed to the throne, which was a possibility that caused much concern in England and Scotland because both James and Mary were Catholics and the majority of people wanted a Protestant monarch. Like so many of his brothers and sisters, the infant Duke lived for a little more than a month, dying on 12 December the same year he was born. Charles was buried in Westminster Abbey, on 13 December 1677. His younger brother was James Francis Edward Stuart, The Old Pretender.

Arms
During his short life, Charles bore a coat of arms, as a grandson of a British Sovereign, consisting those of the kingdom, differenced by a label argent of five points ermine.

Ancestry

|-

References

Bibliography
 

1677 births
1677 deaths
17th-century English nobility
People from London
Dukes of Cambridge
Courtesy dukes
Princes of England
Princes of Scotland
House of Stuart
Children of James II of England
Burials at Westminster Abbey
Royalty and nobility who died as children
Sons of kings
Heirs apparent who never acceded